Foreign direct investment in Iran (FDI) has been hindered by unfavorable or complex operating requirements and by international sanctions, although in the early 2000s the Iranian government liberalized investment regulations. Iran ranks 62nd in the World Economic Forum's 2011 analysis of the global competitiveness of 142 countries. In 2010, Iran ranked sixth globally in attracting foreign investments.

Foreign investors have concentrated their activity in a few sectors of the economy: the oil and gas industries, vehicle manufacture, copper mining, petrochemicals, foods, and pharmaceuticals. Iran absorbed US$24.3 billion of foreign investment from 1993 to 2007 and US$34.6 billion for 485 projects from 1992 to 2009.

Opening Iran's market place to foreign investment could also be a boon to competitive multinational firms operating in a variety of manufacturing and service sectors, worth $600 billion to $800 billion in new investment opportunities over the next decade.

FDI statistics

Countries

Firms from over 50 countries have invested in Iran in the past 16 years (1992–2008), with Asia and Europe receiving the largest share, as follows:

Sectors

As of 2007, Asian entrepreneurs made the largest investments in the Islamic state by investing in 40 out of 80 projects funded by foreigners. The largest amount of foreign investment was in the industrial sector, including food and beverage, tobacco, textiles, clothing, leather, chemical, steel and oil derivates. The figure exceeded US$8.76 billion. Water, electricity and gas sector ranked second, attracting $874.83 million. In the third place, the real estate sector absorbed more than $406 million. Investments in service, telecommunication, transportation and mines reached $193 million, $14.3 million and $14.2 million respectively. Asian countries invested $7.666 billion in various projects followed by several multinational consortia. Investments by these multinational companies exceeded $1.39 billion (in four projects). Although European entrepreneurs were involved in 34 projects, they invested only in the range of $1.2 billion in the Islamic Republic. American countries also committed $12.329 million in the country; while investments by African states registered close to $4 million.

Amounts

Stock of FDI in Iran equaled $16.82 billion (at home) and $2.075 billion (abroad) according to The World Factbook statistics in 2010.

According to the United Nations Conference on Trade and Development (UNCTAD), foreign direct investment (FDI) in Iran hit a new record in 2010 and surpassed 3.6 billion dollars despite sanctions imposed on the Islamic Republic. The EIU estimates that Iran's net FDI flow will rise by 100 per cent within the next four years (2010–14). The Economist estimates that FDI (net inflow) in Iran was $1.4 billion in 2011 (equivalent to 0.3% of GDP) down from $3.2 billion in 2010. The report forecasts this figure for 2012 to fall to $1.25 billion, but increase again for the next 3 years and to reach $1.8 billion in 2015. The Government of Iran says planned FDI in 2011 was $4.3 billion and planned FDI will reach $8–10 billion in 2012–13. However, UNCTAD later reported that FDI inflow in Iran was $3.05 billion in 2013, while Iran's FDI in other countries (i.e. outflow FDI) was $380 million.

Bushehr Province and Khuzestan Province enjoy the highest volume of foreign investment which mostly goes for oil and gas sectors. In 2012, the provinces of Fars, Gilan, Tehran, Kerman, Mazandaran and West Azerbaijan ranked first to sixth place in attracting foreign investment in the country.

According to the government of Iran, Iran needs up to $300 billion in foreign direct investment to meet the objectives of its Five-Year Economic Development Plan (2010–2015), and reach eight percent economic growth rate. Turning to "Vision 2025", the plan has set an investment target of $3.7 trillion within two decades (2005–2025) of which $1.3 trillion should be in the form of foreign investment.

Companies

The Organization for Investment, Economic and Technical Assistance of Iran (OIETAI) is responsible for receiving and processing all foreign investment applications. OIETAI is also responsible for approving overseas Iranian investments. In other words, the organization is in charge of consolidating and implementing two-way foreign investment flows. According to Iranian President Rouhani cooperation with Iran is on the condition that foreign companies participate in joint investments, technology programs, and exporting from Iran.

As at 2012, 400 foreign companies are directly investing in Iran. Among developed nations, the most active investors have been Germans, Norwegian, British, French, Japanese, Russian, South Korean, Swedish, and Swiss companies. The Swedish Svedala Industri has played a major role in developing Iran's copper mines since the late 1990s while Tata Steel of India has been investing in the steel sector. The Kia, Nissan, Peugeot, and Renault of France auto companies have licensing agreements with Iranian auto manufacturers. Danone of France, Nestlé of Switzerland and Coca-Cola and Pepsi-Cola of the United States have joint ventures with Iranian companies. Total, Statoil, Shell, Gazprom, and Lucky Goldstar of South Korea have been active in Iran's natural gas industry. Iran's constitution prohibits direct concession of petroleum rights to foreign investors. Alcatel of France, MTN Group of South Africa and Siemens of Germany gained major telecommunications contracts in 2004 and 2005, respectively.

Front men

In 2015, The Economist and The Wall Street Journal reported that American companies (incl. Apple Inc. and Hewlett-Packard) are using local (Iranian) front men to seal deals in Iran. In the oil and banking business some "prime contracts" have already been signed while Iran is still under "international sanctions". Boeing, Microsoft, Siemens, BP, Chevron, Gazprom, Eni, Samsung, Renault. Peugeot, GM are also returning to Iran.

Economic profile

Business environment

 
According to United Nations Conference on Trade and Development, Iran ranked sixth globally in 2010 in attracting foreign investments. According to the head of the Organisation for Investment, Economic and Technical Assistance of Iran (OIETAI), in 2008 Iran ranked 142 among 181 countries in terms of working conditions last year. Iran stands 96 in terms of business start, 165 in getting permits, 147 in employment, 147 in registering assets, 84 in getting credits, 164 in legal support for investments, 104 in tax payment, 142 in overseas trade, 56 in feasibility of contracts and 107 in bankruptcy. Iran is a member of the World Bank's Multilateral Investment Guarantee Agency. Iran ranks 69th out of 139 in Global Competitiveness Report. Iran has more than 50 signed-bilateral investment treaties with other countries.

Natural resources

Iran is OPEC's second largest oil producer. It has approximately 9% of world oil reserves (some 94 billion barrels). It has the second largest reserves of natural gas in the world at some 812 trillion cubic feet. Iran is considered an energy superpower. Iran also possesses enormous mineral resources, including coal, copper, iron, zinc and gold. This has spawned a number of processing industries, particularly steel. Iran is already the third largest producer of copper in the world.

Competitive advantages

Iran has made the development of non-oil exports a priority. The country has the advantage of a broad domestic industrial base, technology an educated and motivated workforce, cheap labor and energy resources and geographical location, which gives it access to an estimated population of some 300 million people in Caspian markets, Persian Gulf states and countries further east. Iran has the consumer potential of Turkey, the oil reserves of Saudi Arabia, the natural gas reserves of Russia, and the mineral reserves of Australia. Iran's area roughly equals that of the United Kingdom, France, Spain, and Germany combined. Iran has a diverse climate which makes it suitable for a wide range of agricultural products.

Laws concerning foreign companies

Generally speaking, Iran has two types of laws concerning foreign companies. The first are laws that address issues concerning foreign companies directly such as the Foreign Investment Promotion and Protection Act (FIPPA) and the second are general laws of which certain articles or by-laws address foreign companies, for instance the Taxation Law and the Labor Law. Iran's environment is protected by strict laws and the Department of the Environment is in charge of evaluating the impact of the projects and their monitoring.

General laws and regulations regarding foreign business in Iran could be regrouped under the following categories:

Contract work - A foreign company is allowed to be involved in contractual work in Iran. Such work may be performed either directly by the foreign company or through a registered branch in Iran. Branch offices in Iran do not have the separate legal status enjoyed by LLCs, and the parent company is responsible for the actions of the branch office. For legal and tax purposes, opening a representative office in Iran, by itself, is not considered foreign direct investment.  Establishing and setting up a legal presence in the Iranian market requires a local advisor who can provide a step-by-step advisory service regarding incorporation, office rental, recruitment, staff, business contracts, customs, and the laws in general. CMS Cameron McKenna is among the first major international law firms to open office in Iran.
Direct sales - Most foreign companies are involved in direct sales to Iranian customers through letters of credit and, occasionally on the basis of Usance.
Investments - In accordance with the terms of the Foreign Investment Promotion and Protection Act (FIPPA), foreign companies may invest in newly established factories and industries. Foreign companies are allowed to own 100 per cent of the businesses.

Investment by natural persons of foreign nationality

In 2006, Iranian citizens abroad's net worth was $1.3 trillion. In 2000, the Iran Press Service reported that Iranian expatriates had invested between $200 and $400 billion in the United States, Europe, and China, but almost nothing in Iran. In Dubai, Iranian expatriates have invested an estimated $200 billion (2006).

According to the Civil Code, foreign nationals will, subject to the existence of a treaty on reciprocity, enjoy the same rights and privileges of Iranians. The companies formed by such foreign nationals will be of Iranian nationality and subject to the same laws which regulate the activities of Iranian companies.

Foreign investment in the framework of the Commercial Code

The Iranian Commercial Code is divided into four parts: 
merchant and trade activities, 
trade companies, 
negotiable instruments, 
contracts and bankruptcy.

Foreign nationals can, in the framework of the Commercial Code and subject to the observance of the relevant procedures, form and register companies in Iran. Iran's Commercial Code does not differentiate between Iranian and foreign stock holders of Iranian companies. In other words, there is no restriction regarding the nationality of those who want to establish companies in Iran. In this context, foreign exchange restrictions are equally applied to Iranian and foreign investors. Such companies, however, do not enjoy the privileges set out in FIPPA (see below).

There are seven types of juridical entity or company which can be established under the Iranian Commercial Code as follows:

Joint-stock company may be either a public company (Sherkat Sahami Am) or a private company (Sherkat Sahami Khass)
Limited liability company (LLC) (Sherkat ba Masouliyat Mahdoud)
General partnership (Sherkat Tazamoni)
Limited partnership (Sherkat Mokhtalet Gheyr Sahami)
Joint stock partnership (Sherkat Mokhtalet Sahami)
Proportional liability partnership (Sherkat Nesbi)
Manufacturing / Consumer Co-operative (Sherkat Ta’avoni va Masraf)

From among all these different types, joint-stock company, in which the capital is divided by shares, is the most common and acceptable type of company which can be recommended to foreign investors.

FIPPA

Provisions of the 2002 Act entitled Foreign Investment Promotion and Protection Act (FIPPA) include:

Allowing foreign investment in all sectors opened to Iranian private companies.
A review of the definition of "Foreign Investor" to include Iranian expatriates provided that their investment capital originates from abroad.
Allowing repatriation of local sales related profits in addition to export-related profits in hard currency at the current official exchange rate.
Fair compensation in case of nationalization. If an act of the government disrupts the business activity, the government will be under obligation to make payments for any loan installments that are due on behalf of the project company.
FIPPA allows for international arbitration in legal disputes. There are two major arbitral institutions in Iran: the Tehran Regional Arbitration Centre (TRAC) and the Arbitration Centre of the Tehran Commercial Chamber.
The establishment of a maximum 45-day period for the processing of individual foreign investment applications.

For the first time, project financing schemes such as buy back agreements and BOT projects (only under an operator status) are specifically covered under the foreign investment law.
Under the FIPPA, any foreign natural or legal person importing capital in Iran will enjoy the benefits and privileges of this law as long as:

The investment leads to economic growth, promotes technology, promotes quality of products, increases employment opportunities, increases exports and entering the international markets.
The investment does not jeopardize national security and public interests or harm the environment or interrupt national economy or disrupt products of domestic investments.
The investment does not involve the granting of any special rights resulting in a monopoly.
The value ratio of goods and services produced by aggregate of foreign investments does not exceed 25% in each economic sector and in each economic branch shall not exceed 35%. FIPPA will be applicable based on the nationality of the Foreign Capital as opposed to the investor. As long as the capital comes from foreign sources, any one importing it will be eligible for FIPPA protection including Iranians residing in Iran or abroad.

Starting in 2014, foreign investors, who establish production lines in Iran and export 30 percent of their products, will be entitled to tax exemptions (up to 50%).

Potential approaches to the market

First and foremost, it is crucial to realize that Iranian authorities insist on a long-term commitment and a transfer of technology as a requisite for getting a share in the market. Foreign companies are therefore advised to adopt a medium- to long-term strategy for the Iranian market. Iran will almost never honor the interests of a company that does not show long-term commitment. Tenders are strictly required for government contracts for purchasing or projects. These are rarely competitive. Breaking up contracts into smaller parts is a common practice to try to incorporate at least 30% of the contract's value in local capability and also to negotiate on specific prices.

Currently there are three main routes that a foreign company can follow to establish a long-term presence in Iran:

Joint ventures

One possible strategy is for the foreign company to enter into a joint-venture agreement with a public or private Iranian partner. The existing level of technology and infrastructure makes many Iranian companies suitable for expansion and development in conjunction with foreign companies. Many Iranian companies, especially those in the private sector, are currently actively seeking joint-venture partners both to fill their technological as well as management gaps. Others are looking for a revival of their company through foreign capital.

Should a company decide to adopt this approach to the market, it is advisable to look for products and services that have both domestic demand as well as regional export potential. If a joint-venture company can earn hard currency through export of its goods, it will not be too dependent on the Iranian banking system for the repatriation of profits and dividends. Some joint ventures consist purely of the transfer of technology to Iran by the foreign partner without any capital commitment. Since Iranian authorities are very keen on the introduction of modern technologies, this path can prove very constructive. In August 2010, the 25% ceiling set for joint venture companies in enjoying facilities from the foreign exchange reserve account has been eliminated. Industry and mines, agriculture, transport, services (such as tourism), IT and the export of goods and services are the sectors authorized to enjoy the new facilities from the Foreign Exchange Reserve Account.

Buy-back

In the 1990s and early 2000s, some indirect oilfield development agreements were made with foreign firms. Buyback contracts in the oil sector, for instance, were arranged in which the contractor funded all the investments, and then received remuneration from the National Iranian Oil Company (NIOC) in the form of an allocated production share, then transferred operation of the field to NIOC after a set number of years, at which time the contract was completed.

In February 2007 the government unveiled its new buyback-contract formula, which significantly extended the length of the contracts to as long as 20 years. The buy-back scheme is a formula used by the Iranian government to attract foreign investment. Following the end of the Iran–Iraq War in 1988, Iran faced a major problem: it needed foreign investment if it did not want to lose its vital income from the oil and gas industry, yet its revolutionary ideology and Constitution forbid granting "concessions". A compromise solution was found in 1989 with the First Five-Year Economic, Social and Cultural Development Plan. Under Note 29 of the said plan, the Iranian government is allowed to employ "buybacks" in its effort to meet the industrial and mineral needs in connection with exports, production and investment. Put in laymen terms, a buy-back transaction is a method of trade where plants, machinery, production equipment and technology is supplied (by a domestic or foreign private firm), in exchange for the goods that will be produced directly or indirectly by means of such facilities.

Under this scheme, the foreign partner that makes the initial investment can repatriate the return on the investment (at a pre-agreed fixed rate) through goods and services produced by the project. While many foreign companies believe that this method is a mere financing instrument for Iran, it is more accurate to say that it is a compromise formula for foreign investment in the short-run. In the medium to long-term, more appropriate laws and regulations will probably replace the buy-back scheme. In other words, once the constitutional concerns have been dealt with, the foreign partners of buy-back agreements can take over the projects that they are involved in, or they can enter into a joint venture with an Iranian partner.

The Iranian (or Integrated) Petroleum Contract (IPC)
Some of the main criticisms of the buyback contracts include lack of flexibility of cost recovery and in some cases, the NIOC's limited expertise to reverse field decline rates in comparison to the International Oil Company (IOC) that developed the field. The Integrated Petroleum Contract (IPC) will require the IOCs to fulfill Iran's local content requirement, which will be 51% of the contract and transfer of technology. IPCs will be offered for work on somewhere between 34 and 74 oil fields and could last for the duration of a field's life. In 2013 Iran also announced for the first time since the Iranian Revolution of 1979, the offering of production sharing contracts (PSCs) for the most complicated and difficult projects, such as deep-water wells in the Caspian Sea (the details of which will be revealed in December 2015 in London).

Build-Operate-Transfer (BOT)

Recent regulations have introduced the Build–operate–transfer (BOT) scheme for Iranian projects. This is a rather new possibility in the Iranian market. In this scheme, the foreign partner invests in one project, which is then operated for a certain period of time by the foreign investor before it is fully transferred to the Iranian government. Iranian authorities are showing some flexibility regarding the BOT, which could potentially pave the way for more foreign investment in the market.

Free trade zones and special economic zones

Iran's interest in free zones can be traced back to the 1970s.

Advantages
Free-trade (FTZ) and special economic zones (SEZ) have been established to provide additional investment incentives such as:
20 years tax-exemption (15 years, before 2014);
no entry visa requirement;
100% foreign ownership possible;
flexible employment regulations;
flexible monetary & banking services;
extended legal guarantees & protection.

Locations

As of January 2010, there were six free-trade zones (FTZ) and 16 special economic zones (SEZ) in Iran. More FTZ and SEZ are planned in Iran.

Outward FDI

Iran has made substantial investments abroad. The main agencies in charge are the Iran Foreign Investments Company (FDI) and the Central Bank of Iran (Forex). Broadly speaking, these investments can be categorized as FDI and foreign portfolio investments:

Outward FDI include: 
Joint car factories abroad (e.g. Syria, Azerbaijan, Senegal, Belarus, Venezuela)
Various joint petrochemical plants
Various power plants

Portfolio investments include:
National Development Fund portfolio investments abroad.
Foreign exchange reserves held abroad (see also: Iranian frozen assets)

Partial ownership in:
Daimler Benz (sold after its merger with Chrysler)
Thyssen Krupp (Germany)
Eurodif (see also: Nuclear program of Iran)
Shah Deniz gas filed in the Caspian Sea
Oil and gas field in North sea (UK)
Various hotels, hospitals and agricultural enterprises, mostly in the MENA and Africa regions.
Skyscraper in Manhattan, New York (seized)
All embassies and many commercial buildings belonging to the state including banks (e.g. Naftiran Intertrade in Switzerland)
Oil pipelines in the ME, including in Israel (see also: Transport in Iran)

Besides, Iranians citizens and Iranian citizens abroad, as individuals, have made substantial investments in Dubai (e.g. real estate, trading companies) and hold significant portfolio investments in various companies throughout Europe, China and the United States. Wealthy Iranians, companies and state-backed buyers will invest up to $8.5 billion in overseas real estate over the next five-to-10 years (2016).

See also

Economy of Iran
National Development Fund - Iran's sovereign wealth fund
Asalouyeh 
Iran's outward FDI in oil fields
Investment promotion agency
List of Iranian companies
Privatization in Iran
Tehran Stock Exchange
Iran Chamber of Commerce Industries and Mines - Including information on commercial dispute resolution
Iran International Exhibitions Company
Organization of Investment Economic and Technical Assistance of Iran
Trade Promotion Organization of Iran
Government of Iran
Next Eleven - list of countries having a high potential of becoming the world's largest economies in the 21st century by Goldman Sachs
EU-Iran Forum

References

Bibliography
Books

Investment guide

General statistics

External links
Government related
Doing business in Iran: trade and export guide - U.K. Government
 Ministry of Economic Affairs and Finance Of Iran  - Official Website
 Ministry of Industry , Mine & Trade  Of Iran – Official Website
 Organization For Investment, Economic and Technical Assistance of Iran - Government "one-stop institution" for FDI in Iran
 Iran Foreign Investment Company (IFIC)  - (In charge of managing Iran's holdings abroad)
 Trade Promotion Organization Of Iran  - Affiliated with the Ministry of Industry, Mine and Trade of Iran
 High Council of Iran Free Trade-Industrial Zone  - Official site with information on Iran's Free Trade Zones laws and current projects
 Business consulting information - Affiliated to the Iran Chamber of Commerce Industries and Mines
 Information on the Foreign Investment Promotion and Protection Act (FIPPA) and Taxes  - Ministry of Economic Affairs and Finance (Iran)
 Buy-backs in Iran's oil industry - Atieh Bahar Group (2002)
General
 Business Year – Iran (VIP interviews, economic data, sector reports)
 Iran Investment Organization - Consulting services
 Iranian Business Practice and Regulation - U.K.-Iran Chamber of Commerce
 Iran Business Forecast Report - Business Monitor International (Economic & sector reports updated quarterly)
 Global Investment in Iran - American Enterprise Institute (list of major international companies investing in Iran broken down by their nationality, sector of activity and amount invested)
 Iran Trade Point Network UN's global trade network, including list of English translations of Iranian laws
 FDI.net  - Information about FDI in Iran from the World Bank.
  - Information on business etiquette in Iran

Foreign trade of Iran
Foreign relations of Iran
Iran
Special economic zones
Investment by country